Alconaba is a municipality in the Province of Soria, Castilla y León, Spain. It belongs to the Comarca de Campo de Gómara.

In the Catholic hierarchy, Alconaba belongs to the Diocese of Osma-Soria, which is part of the Archdiocese of Burgos.

In addition to Alconaba proper, the municipality includes the villages of Cubo de Hogueras, Martialay and Ontalvilla de Valcorba.

Toponymy 
The current name, like many placenames in Spain, is an adaptation of the original Arabic name: al-qunnaba, meaning "hemp".

References

Municipalities in the Province of Soria